1301 Avenue of the Americas (also known as the Crédit Agricole CIB Building; formerly the Crédit Lyonnais Building and the J.C. Penney Building) is a 609 ft (186m) tall skyscraper in Manhattan, New York City. It is located on the west side of Sixth Avenue (Avenue of the Americas) between 52nd and 53rd Streets.

History
The building was developed by Uris Buildings Corporation and was completed in 1964 and has 45 floors. Uris purchased the  parcel on the west side of the Avenue of the Americas from the Astor trust for $9 million in January 1964 (equivalent to $ million in ). Shreve, Lamb & Harmon Associates designed the building, which is the 123rd tallest in New York City.

J. C. Penney purchased the building for $55 million in 1977 (equivalent to $ million in ) to serve as its new headquarters. By 1978, J. C. Penney had moved over 5,000 employees into the building. However, in 1988 J. C. Penney announced its intentions to move their headquarters to Dallas, leaving the building empty and up for sale.

In May 1988, Tishman Speyer and Trammell Crow Company bought the empty tower at auction for $353 million (equivalent to $ million in ) and began an ambitious renovation. The companies brought on a consortium of pension funds as equity partners and received a $600 million loan from the Japanese Sanwa Bank. The new owners embarked on a renovation plan designed by Skidmore, Owings & Merrill that involved asbestos removal, a new color scheme for the facade, the expansion and redesign of the lobby and the creation of a new plaza with new paving, seating, plants and sculpture.

It is named for the Calyon Corporation which resulted from the merger of Crédit Agricole Indosuez and the corporate and investment banking division of the Crédit Lyonnais corporation as a result of the takeover of the latest by Crédit Agricole S.A. in 2002. Calyon was since renamed Credit Agricole Corporate and Investment Bank in 2010. It used to serve as the headquarters of PricewaterhouseCoopers before they moved to 300 Madison Avenue. It is now Credit Agricole CIB's US headquarters.

In October 2016, Paramount Group received $850 million to refinance the building from AXA Equitable Holdings, MetLife and New York Life Insurance Company.

Tenants
The building's other tenants include public accounting firm CohnReznick, the law firm Norton Rose Fulbright, the law firm Wilson Sonsini Goodrich & Rosati, and Barclays.

At one time RJR Nabisco had its headquarters in the building. After RJR Nabisco was separated, Nabisco Group Holdings Corp. had its headquarters in Calyon.

See also
List of tallest buildings in New York City

References

External links

Emporis
Skyscraperpage

Skyscraper office buildings in Manhattan
Midtown Manhattan
Sixth Avenue
Office buildings completed in 1964
1964 establishments in New York City